The episode list of the American television sitcom Coach which was shown on ABC from February 28, 1989, to May 14, 1997, with 200 episodes produced over nine seasons.

Series overview

Episodes

Season 1 (1989)

Season 2 (1989–90)

Season 3 (1990–91)

Season 4 (1991–92)

Season 5 (1992–93)

Season 6 (1993–94)

Season 7 (1994–95)

Season 8 (1995–96)

Season 9 (1996–97)

Notelist

References

External links
List of Coach episodes at Internet Movie Database

Coach